Maria Viktoria Mena (born 19 February 1986) is a Norwegian pop singer, best known for her singles such as "You're the Only One", "Just Hold Me", "All This Time" which charted in multiple countries.

Early life 
Maria Mena was born into an artistic family. Her father is a drummer. There was a common misconception that her mother is a playwright, but Mena debunked this in an interview. Both Maria and her brother, Tony, are named after characters from Leonard Bernstein's West Side Story. Her mother is Norwegian and her father is an American of Afro-Nicaraguan descent.

Her father played in several bands in Oslo, which influenced Mena to write and record her own music. When Mena was nine years old, her parents divorced. She suffered from depression and developed an eating disorder.

When Mena was 13 years old, she moved to live with her father. She sang and wrote lyrics as a form of self-soothing. "My Lullaby", a song from Mena's diary, expresses her pain from her parents' divorce. After pleading with her father to make a demo, he contacted some acquaintances in the music industry to record the demo. Presenting his daughter's demo to several record companies, Sony Music signed Mena to their label.

Career

2002–2007: Early beginnings 
In 2002, she released her debut single "Fragile (Free)" in Norway; however, it did not chart there. "My Lullaby" was released as the second single and the song reached number 5 on the Norwegian Singles Chart. It received heavy rotation on NRK P1, P3, P4, Radio 1, and Radio Oslo. The young singer quickly gained fans and soon earned her first platinum record. After the success of "My Lullaby", she released her debut album Another Phase in Norway which reached number 6 on the Norwegian Albums Chart.
Mena made an appearance on the Late Show with David Letterman to promote her first international album, White Turns Blue, which debuted at the top position on the Billboard Top Heatseekers chart a week later and at number 102 on the Billboard 200. She made a breakthrough into the worldwide singles charts that year with "You're the Only One", a single successful in multiple countries. The song was her only single to appear on a Billboard chart, making No. 25 on the U.S. Top 40 Mainstream. "You're the Only One" peaked at No. 30 on the Dutch Top 40 and No. 19 on the Dutch Mega Single Top 100. Two months earlier, in March 2004, Mena had released her second album in Norway. Mellow. Less successful than her 2002 debut, it still managed to peak at No. 7 in Norway. The second single from both albums was "Just a Little Bit", which did not chart anywhere.

2005 saw the release of Apparently Unaffected in Norway and several other European countries, fronted by singles "Miss You Love" and "Just Hold Me". A significant success in Norway, the album has earned her three Spellemann nominations: Best Female Artist, Best Hit, and Best Music Video. In the Netherlands, the album was released in June 2006 and charted at No. 82. It slowly climbed the chart to reach its peak position in its 27th week at No. 11, as "Just Hold Me" was getting airplay again. "Just Hold Me" was released in May 2006, but then did not chart in the official Dutch Top 40, but did chart in the country's physical singles chart, the Mega Single Top 100, at No. 27. In October 2006, the song started getting heavy airplay again and this time it reached the official Dutch Top 40 and peaked at No. 26. In the Mega Single Top 100, it peaked at No. 7 in the beginning of November 2006. Mena performed at sold-out concerts in Utrecht and Amsterdam, following the success of "Just Hold Me". The album was at No. 48 at the Dutch year-end chart, outselling major artists such as Pink's I'm Not Dead, Nelly Furtado's Loose, and Beyoncé Knowles' B'Day. "Miss You Love" was released as the album's second single in the Netherlands and reached No. 61 on the Mega Singles Top 100.

On 7 July 2007, she performed at the German leg of Live Earth in Hamburg.

2008–2014: Cause and Effect, Viktoria, and Weapon in Mind 
Having worked on her three first studio albums with Norwegian producer Arvid Solvang, Mena started collaborating with Martin Sjølie in early 2008 on what would become her fourth studio album, Cause and Effect.
The album's first single, "Belly Up" had its radio premiere mid-June 2008 on Norwegian radio. Cause and Effect was released on 17 September in Norway. The first international single was "All This Time". The album was internationally released on 26 September 2008. This album garnered her a Spellemann for Best Female Artist.

Mena's song "Sorry" was featured on the third season of US So You Think You Can Dance and "What's Another Day" was featured during the fourth season. She released "All This Time" in the UK on 11 April 2010.

In 2011 Mena recorded her version of "Mitt lille land" (My Little Country) by Ole Paus as part of a project by the Norwegian TV channel TV2. On 23 July, the day after the Norway terrorist attacks and after requests from her Norwegian audience, Mena uploaded her version of the song to the streaming site SoundCloud. It quickly became an anthem in memory of the victims of the attacks. She contributed to the album Mitt lille land, performing one of two versions of the title track (the other was performed by Ole Paus). As of 2011 Mena had sold a total of 700,000 copies of her albums, and half of those copies had been sold in Norway.

Her fifth studio album Viktoria was released on 23 September 2011 and was produced by Martin Sjølie.

Her sixth album Weapon in Mind was released in 2013, becoming her first album to reach number one in Norway. Even though all three singles of the album failed to chart inside top 20 Norway Singles Chart, "Fuck You" and "I Always Liked That" became two of her best selling singles in Norway, both certified 2× Platinum.

2015–present: Growing Pains and They Never Leave Their Wives 
Mena released the single "I Don't Wanna See You with Her" on 6 November 2015. Her seventh studio album Growing Pains was released on 4 December 2015.

In March 2020, Mena announced a new album (sometimes recognized as an EP), They Never Leave Their Wives. The album was released on 23 October 2020. Mena released three singles from the album, "Not OK", "Lies (They Never Leave Their Wives)", and "You Live and You Learn".

In October 2020, Mena announced that she will release a new album in March 2021. In April 2021 Mena made a new announcement, saying she will postpone the release of her new material until she can play concerts again. The concert venues in Norway have been closed for longer periods during the COVID-19 pandemic.
She described the upcoming album as a sequel to They Never Leave Their Wives, containing songs about a woman who is on her own and then finds love. 

In August 2022, Mena was cast in the second season of the Viaplay series Furia. Mena also auditioned for a role in the Norwegian TV series Etterglød (Afterglow), where she was not cast but offered to make a song for the soundtrack. That song is "It Was Love", which was released on 23 September 2022.

Discography

Studio albums

Compilation albums

EPs

Singles

As lead artist

As featured artist

Promotional singles 

Notes
1: The single was officially released in the Netherlands, Germany, Spain and Austria in 2007.
2: The single was officially released in the Netherlands in 2009.
3: "Belly Up" was only released in Norway.
4: "Habits" was only released in the Netherlands.

Awards and nominations 
As of 2013, Maria Mena had had 11 Spellemannprisen (Norwegian Grammy) nominations, and won one for Best Female Artist in 2008.

Notes
1: Nomination goes to director of the music video Alex Herron.
2: Special award given by TONO, copyright organisation for musicians and composers in Norway.

Footnotes

References

External links 

Maria's official blog
Official fanclub Germany, Austria and Switzerland
Official fanclub Netherlands
Last.fm Group
LiveJournal Community

http://www.scandipop.co.uk/?p=6549
https://web.archive.org/web/20140624161232/http://soundcloud.com/maria-mena/maria-mena-mitt-lille-land

1986 births
Living people
Norwegian pop musicians
Norwegian pop singers
Norwegian songwriters
Norwegian singer-songwriters
Musicians from Oslo
Spellemannprisen winners
Norwegian people of Nicaraguan descent
Norwegian feminists
Feminist musicians
21st-century Norwegian singers
21st-century Norwegian women singers